Wuna of Wessex (also known as Wunna, Winna, Wina, and Bonna) was a 7th and 8th-century Anglo-Saxon noblewoman and Christian saint. The name Wuna means "The Joyful One". Her actual name is unknown, but she has been called Wuna since the Middle Ages.

History 
According to Christian tradition, Wuna was the wife of Richard the Pilgrim and the mother of Willibald, Walpurga, and Winibald. She was from a noble family in Wessex. Some scholars have argued that she was a sister of Boniface.

She died around the year 710; and is venerated in the Catholic Church with a feast day on 7 February.

References 

710 deaths
7th-century English women
7th-century English people
8th-century English women
8th-century English people
Anglo-Saxon royal consorts
Anglo-Saxon saints
Female saints of medieval England
Christian royal saints
Roman Catholic royal saints
Wessex